Leucostethus is a genus of frogs in the family Dendrobatidae, in the subfamily Colostethinae. The frogs are found in the western Amazon rainforest.

The members of this genus are unique among the Colostethinae in that both males and females lack dark colouration on the ventral part of their bodies. The genus is named combining the Greek words leukos ('white') and stethos ('chest').

There are six species in this genus.
 Leucostethus argyrogaster
 Leucostethus brachistriatus
 Leucostethus fraterdanieli (pictured)
 Leucostethus fugax
 Leucostethus jota
 Leucostethus ramirezi

References

Frogs of South America
Poison dart frogs
Amphibian genera